St Elizabeth of Portugal Church is a Grade II listed Roman Catholic parish church in The Vineyard, Richmond in the London Borough of Richmond upon Thames, south west London. It is adjacent to The Vineyard Life Church. Dedicated to a 14th-century queen consort of Portugal, it claims to be oldest standing Catholic Church in the Archdiocese of Southwark.

History
The church dates from the 1790s. The present building in yellow and red brick, which is Grade II listed and dates from 1824, was the gift of Elizabeth Doughty. It was designed by Thomas Hardwick. A gallery was added in 1851. The chancel, presbytery and tower were rebuilt in 1903 according to plans drawn up by the architect Frederick Walters. The representations of the Stations of the Cross around the nave were designed by Don Pavey in the 1950s and painted by Jo Ledger.

Famous worshippers at the church include ex-King Manoel II of Portugal in the early 20th century.

Events

Marriages
 Phil Lynott, rock musician, married Caroline Crowther, daughter of British comedian Leslie Crowther, on 14 February 1980
Barbara Dickson, singer-songwriter and actress, married Oliver Cookson, TV producer, in August 1984

Funerals
 Phil Lynott, rock musician (1949–1986), on 9 January 1986

Current activities
The parish priest is Father Stephen Langridge. Mass is held daily. Other activities are listed in the church's weekly newsletter.

Gallery

References

External links
Official website
Listing in Archdiocese of Southwark Parish Directory
Listing in Taking Stock, Catholic Churches of England & Wales

1790s establishments in England
19th-century Roman Catholic church buildings in the United Kingdom
Frederick Walters buildings
Grade II listed churches in the London Borough of Richmond upon Thames
Saint Elizabeth
Churches in the Diocese of Southwark
Roman Catholic churches completed in 1903
Roman Catholic churches in the London Borough of Richmond upon Thames
Saint Elizabeth